This is a list of extinct volcanoes in Poland.

Notes

Poland

Volcanoes